Moner Manush (English: Ideal Person) is a 1997 romantic action film directed by Sujit Guha featuring Prosenjit Chatterjee and Rituparna Sengupta in the lead roles.

Plot

Cast
Prosenjit Chatterjee as Rahul
Rituparna Sengupta as Payel
Shakti Kapoor as Major
Shubhendu Chatterjee as Rahul's Father
Biplab Chatterjee as Aziz 
Dilip Ray as Payel's Father
Aparajita Auddy as Payel's friend

Soundtrack

References

External links
 

1997 films
Bengali-language Indian films
1990s Bengali-language films
Films directed by Sujit Guha